Garpos railway station is a railway station on the South Eastern Railway network in the state of Odisha, India. It serves Garpos village. Its code is GPH. It has three platforms. Passenger, Express and Superfast trains halt at Garpos railway station.

Major Trains
 Tapaswini Express
 Rourkela - Gunupur Rajya Rani Express
 Samaleshwari Express
 Ispat Express

See also
 Sundergarh district

References

Railway stations in Sundergarh district
Chakradharpur railway division